The women's 3000 metres event at the 1994 Commonwealth Games was held on 23 August in Victoria, British Columbia

Results

References

3000
1994
1994 in women's athletics